Primal (Teon Macik) is a fictional comic book superhero appearing in American comic books published by Marvel Comics. The character first appeared in The Uncanny X-Men #529, in the fourth chapter of the "Five Lights" storyline, and was created by Matt Fraction and Kieron Gillen. He is one of the "Five Lights"—a group of mutants who manifested their abilities after the events of "Second Coming".

Publication history
Primal first appeared in Uncanny X-Men. Following his introduction, he, along with Hope Summers, Transonic, Oya, Zero, and Velocidad, began to feature in the series Generation Hope. He continues to make appearances in The Uncanny X-Men as well.

Fictional character biography

The Fourth Light
After rescuing Transonic, Velocidad, and Oya, Hope brought the group to Ukraine to find the next Light. However, by the time they arrived he had already moved on. The group tracked Teon through Europe and eventually found him in Miami Beach. Like the others, Hope's touch stabilized his powers. After his activation, he imprinted on Hope, following her commands. He typically communicates in single words that convey his desires - notably "fight," "flight," and "mate."

Teon accompanied the Lights to Tokyo to subdue Zero, whose powers had gone crazy. Soon thereafter, Teon and the other Lights followed Hope in moving to Utopia Upon arrival, he immediately began sparring Wolverine, by whom he was eventually bested; Teon conceded that Wolverine was the "alpha." Wolverine continues to spar with Teon.

Like the rest of the student-aged population, Teon takes classes taught by more experienced X-Men.  However, he is more concerned with following Hope, and follows her after she abruptly walks out of an ethics class being taught by Emma Frost. He also trains with Hope and the rest of his new team in weapons and tactics. Kavita Rao conducts intelligence tests on Teon and comes to believe that he is of low intelligence. Hope, however, demonstrates that he has normal if not high intelligence if given the correct incentive, but simply lacks the desire to complete his tests.

When Hope and the Lights went to retrieve the Sixth Light, Teon (along with Zero) seemed uniquely immune to the infant telepath's abilities, as he is able to move freely about without any protection. Additionally, he is the only one able to convince the infant child, via telepathy, that it should embrace life and be born. Hope touches the newborn child, and is able to suppress its X-Gene until it becomes older. The Lights' celebration is cut short, however, as their liaison Shadowcat reveals that Teon's parents have sued for custody of the boy.

While both Cyclops and Evangeline Whedon both initially believe that Teon's case is hopeless, Teon surprises everyone by rushing the stand, and giving an eloquent, well-thought-out speech about how he has changed. He explains that the Teon his parents knew died when his X-Gene was activated, and asks his parents to find solace in the fact that he is now happier with Hope on Utopia than he would be at home. This speech wins Teon the right to stay on Utopia. Later, Zero wonders if Teon truly is happy, or if he is faking it to remain close to Hope.

Schism
As Hope and Gabriel prepare to go on their first date, Teon is initially protective of Hope; she tells him to calm down, implying she can handle herself if Gabriel isn't a perfect gentleman.

Powers and abilities
Teon has a primal mutation that enhances all of his physical abilities. Teon also possesses a type of "hyperinstinct" which allows him to process the world in the most efficient manner. He has competently demonstrated that he is fully capable of parsing effectively complex ideas (even being able to appear at a legal hearing and give a dramatic speech about his own personal desires and happiness in an instinctive form of protection when those are both threatened by his being returned to the custody of his parents in his native home country) but he has little to no interest at all in the mannered niceties of polite society. His animalistic mind seems possessed of a natural protection against telepathic probing or assault.

References

External links
UncannyXmen.net Character Bio on Primal

Comics characters introduced in 2010
Marvel Comics mutants